Enrico Massimo Poggi (January 30, 1908 – October 16, 1976) was an Italian sailor who competed in the 1936 Summer Olympics, in the 1948 Summer Olympics, and in the 1952 Summer Olympics. He was born and died in Genoa.

In 1936, he was a crew member of the Italian boat Italia which won the gold medal in the 8-metre class competition. In 1948, he finished eighth as a crew member of the Italian boat Ciocca II in the 6-metre class event. Four years later he was again a crew member of the Italian boat Ciocca II, which finished again eighth in the 6-metre class event.

References

External links
 
 
 
 

1908 births
1976 deaths
Italian male sailors (sport)
Olympic sailors of Italy
Sailors at the 1936 Summer Olympics – 8 Metre
Sailors at the 1948 Summer Olympics – 6 Metre
Sailors at the 1952 Summer Olympics – 6 Metre
Olympic gold medalists for Italy
Olympic medalists in sailing
Medalists at the 1936 Summer Olympics